Intrasporangium calvum is a species of Gram positive, aerobic, endospore-forming bacteria. The species was initially isolated from air in a school dining room in the Soviet Union. The species was first described in 1967, and was the first and only species in the genus Intrasporangium until 2012.

I. calvum can grow in the 20-40 °C range, and can grow in pH 6.0-8.0.

References

Intrasporangiaceae
Bacteria described in 1967